Lee Ki-poong (20 December 1896 – 28 April 1960) was a South Korean politician and Vice President. He was the Minister of National Defense (May 7, 1951 – March 29, 1952) and Mayor of Seoul (June 6, 1949 – May 8, 1951). He was the leader of Liberal Party and supporter of Syngman Rhee (as a President). The Liberal Party held power from 1948 to 1960.

On March 15, 1960, South Korea held a presidential election. The Liberal Party, which included Syngman Rhee and Lee Ki-poong, won by a very wide margin and was accused of electoral fraud. As a result, the April Revolution took place in April 1960. President Rhee resigned on April 26, 1960. Lee Ki-poong's family also resigned.

On April 28, 1960, in an annex of Rhee's mansion, Lee Ki-poong's first son, Lee Kang-seok (1937 – April 28, 1960) shot Lee Ki-poong and his family and then killed himself in a murder–suicide.

See also 
 April Revolution

References

Members of the National Assembly (South Korea)
Speakers of the National Assembly (South Korea)
National Defense ministers of South Korea
Mayors of Seoul
International Olympic Committee members
South Korean people of the Korean War
First Republic of Korea
Korean anti-communists
People from Goesan County
1896 births
1960 deaths
Jeonju Yi clan
Murder–suicides in South Korea
South Korean murder victims
People murdered in South Korea
Deaths by firearm in South Korea
Chiefs of Staff to the President of South Korea